EducationCity provides educational software to schools and homes. The elearning service was founded in 1999 and the company said the site has over 15,500 schools registered and 8,000 families. The service provides educational learning experiences mapped to the National Curriculum in English, Mathematics, Science, language education and computing. The company has won awards and was recently a BETT and ERA finalist and has been reviewed by the Times Educational Supplement a number of times.

In April 2010, EducationCity.com became one of the first ICT content providers to receive accreditation by South West Grid for Learning (SWGfL) Merlin for the integration of the resource into the Merlin Learning platform through the use of Shibboleth and the Systems Interoperability Framework (SIF) .

On 16 May 2011, the site had an Alexa rating of 78,987. EducationCity.com launched a new module, Learn English to address English as an Additional Language (English language learning and teaching) needs in primary school.

EducationCity.com has offices in Rutland, UK and Naperville, US.

History
In June 2010 Archipelago Learning, acquired EducationCity.com. EducationCity.com is planned to remain a stand-alone business unit of Archipelago.  Its headquarters will remain in Rutland, U.K. and Naperville, IL.

References

External links
 EducationCity.com (company website)

Educational software companies
Education in Rutland
Educational technology companies of the United Kingdom
Organisations based in Rutland
Science and technology in Rutland